The 1997 ABC Championship for Women is the qualifying tournament for 1998 FIBA World Championship for Women. The tournament was held on Bangkok, Thailand from April 27 to May 5. The championship is divided into two levels: Level I and Level II. The last finisher of Level I is relegated to Level II and the top finisher of Level II qualify for Level I 1999's championship.

Participating teams

Preliminary round

Level I

Level II – Group A

Level II – Group B

Classification 7th–14th

13th place

11th place

9th place

7th place

Final round

Semifinals

3rd place

Final

Final standing

Awards

Most Valuable Player:  Yoo Young-Joo

References
 Results
 archive.fiba.com

1997
1997 in women's basketball
women
International women's basketball competitions hosted by Thailand
B
April 1997 sports events in Thailand
May 1997 sports events in Thailand
1997 in Thai women's sport